Anthony Eyre may refer to:   

Anthony Eyre (Boroughbridge MP) (1727–88) 
Anthony Eyre (Nottinghamshire MP) (1634–71)